Márcio André Correia Cantanhede, known as Marcinho Guerreiro (born 6 November 1978 in São Luís), is a Brazilian football manager and former player who played as defensive midfielder. He is the current manager of Moto Club.

Honours

Player 
Moto Club
 Campeonato Maranhense: 2000, 2001, 2004
 Copa União do Maranhão: 2003, 2004

Fortaleza 
 Campeonato Cearense: 2008

Treze
 Campeonato Paraibano: 2010

Guarani de Juazeiro
Copa Fares Lopes: 2012

Manager 
Moto Club
 Campeonato Maranhense: 2018

References

1978 births
Living people
People from São Luís, Maranhão
Brazilian footballers
Association football midfielders
Brazilian football managers
Campeonato Brasileiro Série B players
Campeonato Brasileiro Série C players
Campeonato Brasileiro Série D players
Campeonato Brasileiro Série B managers
Campeonato Brasileiro Série C managers
Campeonato Brasileiro Série D managers
Moto Club de São Luís players
FC Atlético Cearense players
Paysandu Sport Club players
América Futebol Clube (RN) players
Associação Desportiva Recreativa e Cultural Icasa players
Sampaio Corrêa Futebol Clube players
Treze Futebol Clube players
Guarani Esporte Clube (CE) players
Guarany Sporting Club players
Guarani Esporte Clube (CE) managers
Moto Club de São Luís managers
Sociedade Imperatriz de Desportos managers
Sampaio Corrêa Futebol Clube managers
Maranhão Atlético Clube managers
Treze Futebol Clube managers
Ríver Atlético Clube managers
Sportspeople from Maranhão
Caucaia Esporte Clube managers